Tanzhou or Tan Prefecture was a zhou (prefecture) in imperial China, centering on modern Miyun County, Beijing, China. It existed (intermittently) from 596 to 1368. In the 10th century it was ceded by Later Jin to the Khitan-ruled Liao dynasty as one of the Sixteen Prefectures.

Geography
The administrative region of Tan Prefecture in the Tang dynasty is in modern Beijing. It probably includes parts of modern: 
Miyun County
Huairou District
Pinggu District

References
 

Prefectures of the Sui dynasty
Prefectures of the Tang dynasty
Prefectures of Later Tang
Prefectures of the Liao dynasty
Prefectures of the Yuan dynasty
Sixteen Prefectures
Former prefectures in Beijing
Prefectures of the Jin dynasty (1115–1234)